David MacIsaac (born April 23, 1972) is a former professional ice hockey player and hockey coach from Cambridge, Massachusetts. 

MacIsaac established his footing in the ice hockey industry when he won the NCAA championship with the University of Maine in 1992–93. He was also selected for the Hockey East All-Rookie team that season. During his collegiate career, MacIsaac majored in physical education with a concentration in teaching and coaching.

In 1995, MacIsaac began his professional hockey career in the International Hockey League. He played more than 750 professional games before moving on to the NHL's primary feeder league, the American Hockey League.

After a nearly 14 season playing career, MacIsaac would move on to coaching. He led the Danbury Mad Hatters (EPHL) to a 30-18-2 record as the head coach in 2008–09. In 2009, MacIsaac would become the head coach of the Louisiana IceGators (SPHL). For the 2011–12 season, he would assume the same role for Bjorninn HC of the Icelandic Hockey League and Bjorninn HC won the league championship that season. He would be named head coach of the Icelandic National team where he led the team to a bronze medal at the World Championships. It was announced in 2021 that MacIsaac would be returning to Danbury, where he captained Danbury Trashers and would be the Head Coach of the Danbury Hat Tricks, leading them to the league semi finals in his only season there. 

MacIsaac speaks 5 different languages: English, French, Russian, Icelandic, and Italian.

Awards and accomplishments:
1992–93 – NCAA Champion (UMaine) & Hockey East All-Rookie Team Selection
1998 – Calder Cup Champion (Philadelphia Phantoms)
2001 – AHL Plus/Minus Player of the Year
2012 – Icelandic Hockey League Champions & Named Assistant Coach of Icelandic National Team
2013 – Head coach of the Icelandic National Hockey Team.

Team captain:
1994–95 University of Maine (NCAA)
1998–99 Philadelphia Phantoms (AHL)
1999–00 Lowell Lock Monsters (AHL)
2000–01 Kentucky Thoroughblades (AHL)
2001–02 Hartford Wolf Pack (AHL)
2002–03 Amur Khabarovsk (Russian Superleague)
2005–06 Danbury Trashers (UHL)

References

External links

1972 births
American men's ice hockey defensemen
Hartford Wolf Pack players
Hershey Bears players
Kentucky Thoroughblades players
Living people
Lowell Lock Monsters players
Maine Black Bears men's ice hockey players
Milwaukee Admirals (IHL) players
Philadelphia Phantoms players
Trenton Devils players